The Room is Harold Pinter's first play, written and first produced in 1957.  Considered by critics the earliest example of Pinter's "comedy of menace", this play has strong similarities to Pinter's second play, The Birthday Party, including features considered hallmarks of Pinter's early work and of the so-called Pinteresque: dialogue that is comically familiar and yet disturbingly unfamiliar, simultaneously or alternatingly both mundane and frightening; subtle yet contradictory and ambiguous characterizations; a comic yet menacing mood characteristic of mid-twentieth-century English tragicomedy; a plot featuring reversals and surprises that can be both funny and emotionally moving; and an unconventional ending that leaves at least some questions unresolved.

Setting and characters
Pinter has confirmed that his visit, in the summer of 1955, to the "broken-down room" of Quentin Crisp, located in Chelsea's Beaufort Street (now renovated and part of a "smart building"), inspired his writing The Room, "set in 'a snug, stuffy rather down-at-heel bedsit with a gas fire and cooking facilities'."  The bedsit is located in an equally rundown rooming house which, like that of Pinter's next play, The Birthday Party, becomes the scene of a visitation by apparent strangers.  Though the single-dwelling two-story house in the later play is in an unidentified "seaside town", and it is purportedly a bed and breakfast-type rooming house run by a childless middle-aged married couple, the building in which Rose and Bert Hudd inhabit their "room" is a multi-dwelling rooming house of more than two stories, and, while Rose accepts being addressed as "Mrs. Hudd", Bert Hudd and she may not actually be legally married to each other, which may be a factor leading to her defensiveness throughout the play.

Plot summary

The play opens with Rose having a "one-person dialog" with her husband Bert, who remains silent throughout the whole scene, while serving him a breakfast fry-up, although the scene appears to occur around evening. Rose talks mostly about the cold weather and keeps comparing the cosy, warm room to the dark, damp basement and to the cold weather outside. She creates a sense of uneasiness by the way she talks and acts, always moving from one place to another in the room, even while sitting, she sits in a rocking chair and rocks. Her speech is filled with many quick subject changes and asks her husband questions, yet answers them herself.

With a few knocks and a permission to enter, Mr. Kidd, the old landlord, enters. He asks Bert many questions regarding if and when he is leaving the room. The questions are answered by Rose while Bert still remains silent. The dialog between Rose and Mr. Kidd consists of many subjects that change very frequently. At times each one of them talks about something different and it seems they are avoiding subjects and aren't listening to each other, creating an irrational dialog. At the end of the scene Bert, who appears to be a truck driver, leaves to drive off in his "van".

Afterward, Rose's attempt to take out the garbage is interrupted by a young couple, Mr. and Mrs. Sands. She invites the couple in and they tell her they are looking for a flat, and for her landlord, Mr. Kidd.

A blind black man, named Riley, who has purportedly been waiting in the basement according to the Sands and Mr. Kidd, becoming a source of concern for Rose, suddenly arrives upstairs to her room, to deliver a mysterious message to Rose from her "father".  The play ends violently when Bert returns, finds Rose stroking Riley's face, delivers a long sexually-suggestive monologue about his experience driving his van while referring to it as if it was a woman, and then beats Riley until he appears lifeless, possibly murdering him, after which Rose cries "Can't see. I can't see. I can't see".

Composition history

Pinter wrote The Room over two or four days in 1957, depending on the account, at the suggestion of his friend Henry Woolf for his production as part of a postgraduate program in directing at the University of Bristol, Bristol, England.

In their published interviews, Pinter and Woolf vary in describing how many days Pinter took to write The Room.  According to Billington, in his official biography Harold Pinter, Woolf asked Pinter to write the play in a letter that Pinter received in the autumn of 1956, when he "was newly married" to actress Vivien Merchant "and in the middle of a season at Torquay"; "[Pinter] replied that he couldn't possibly deliver anything in under six months.  In fact, the play arrived in the post very shortly. It was written over four afternoons and late nights while Pinter was playing in Rattigan's Separate Tables at the Pavilion Theatre, Torquay, in November 1956. The Room, as the play was called, was eventually staged by the Bristol Drama Department in May 1957 in a converted squash-court and in a production by Woolf himself" (66–67).

According to Woolf, Pinter "said he couldn't write a play in under six months. He wrote it in two days, he says four days, no it wasn't it was two days."

Production history
(Source: HaroldPinter.org:)

The Room was first produced by Henry Woolf and presented at The Drama Studio at the University of Bristol in May 1957 and again as part of the National Student Drama Festival held at the University of Bristol in 1958. It was at this second performance that the play was first reviewed by the London Sunday Times by drama critic Harold Hobson, who had helped to found the Drama Festival with some of his colleagues. The original production featured the following cast:

Bert Hudd - Claude Jenkins
Rose Hudd - Susan Engel
Mr. Kidd - Henry Woolf
Mr. Sands - David Davies
Mrs. Sands - Auriol Smith
Riley - George Odlum

The play was presented later at the Hampstead Theatre Club on 21 January 1960 as part of a double bill with The Dumb Waiter. It was directed by Harold Pinter and featured the following cast:

Bert Hudd - Howard Lang
Rose - Vivien Merchant
Mr. Kidd - Henry Woolf
Mr. Sands - John Rees
Mrs. Sands - Auriol Smith
Riley - Thomas Baptiste

The double bill was transferred on 8 March 1960 to the Royal Court Theatre where it was directed by Anthony Page with the following cast:

Bert Hudd - Michael Brennan
Rose - Vivien Merchant
Mr. Kidd - John Cater
Mr. Sands - Michael Caine
Mrs. Sands - Anne Bishop
Riley - Thomas Baptiste

Fiftieth anniversary
In 2007, the fiftieth anniversary of the play's first production, the Theatre Archive Project, a collaboration among the British Library, the University of Sheffield, and the British AHRC, began interviewing surviving members of the cast, as well as the author of the accompanying one-acter The Rehearsal.

In April 2007, as part of a three-day conference Artist and Citizen: 50 Years of Performing Pinter, held at the University of Leeds, in conjunction with which Pinter was awarded his seventeenth Honorary degree, Henry Woolf reprised his role as Mr. Kidd.

On 26 May 2007 students at the University of Bristol, directed by Simon Reade, mounted a production in the original performance space – a converted "squash-court" as described by Billington (67) – which was recorded by the British Library Sound Archive.

See also
Comedy of menace
The Harold Pinter Archive in the British Library
Theatre of the Absurd

Notes

References

Andrews, Jamie.  "Interviews: Harold Pinter's 'The Room' ". Theatre Archive Project (British Library, the University of Sheffield, and AHRC).  Accessed August 21, 2008.  (Transcripts of interviews with Susan Engel, James Severns, Auriol Smith, and Henry Woolf.)
Barrow, Andrew.  Quentin and Philip: A Memoir.  London: Pan Macmillan, 2004. .  (576 pp.)
Billington, Michael.  Harold Pinter. 2nd rev. & enl. ed.  1996.  London: Faber and Faber, 2007.   (10).   (13). ("New and updated edition" of work previously entitled The Life and Work of Harold Pinter.)
Ganz, Arthur R., ed.  Pinter: A Collection of Critical Essays.  Twentieth Century Views. Englewood Cliffs, New Jersey: Prentice Hall, 1972.   (10).   (13).   (10).  (13).  Archived version of full text.
Merritt, Susan Hollis.  Pinter in Play: Critical Strategies and the Plays of Harold Pinter.  1990.  Durham and London: Duke University Press, 1995.   (10).   (13).
Woolf, Henry.  "My 60 Years in Harold's Gang".  The Guardian, July 12, 2007, Stage.  Accessed August 21, 2008.

External links

HaroldPinter.org – Official Website of the International Playwright Harold Pinter.
The Room – Official Webpage at HaroldPinter.org.
The Room at Doollee.com.

1957 plays
Plays by Harold Pinter
1950s debut plays
Tragicomedy plays